Aphrophila is a genus of crane fly in the family Limoniidae.

Species
A. aequalitas Santos and Ribeiro, 2018
A. alexanderi Santos and Ribeiro, 2018
A. amblydonta Alexander, 1971
A. antennata Alexander, 1953
A. aurantiaca Alexander, 1944
A. argentina Santos and Ribeiro, 2018
A. bidentata Alexander, 1968
A. carbonaria Alexander, 1931
A. chilena Alexander, 1928
A. coronata Alexander, 1944
A. dentata Santos and Ribeiro, 2018
A. dupla Santos and Ribeiro, 2018
A. edwardsi Santos and Ribeiro, 2018
A. flavopygialis (Alexander, 1922)
A. huahua Santos and Ribeiro, 2018
A. luteipes Alexander, 1926
A. minuscula Santos and Ribeiro, 2018
A. monacantha Alexander, 1926
A. multidentata Alexander, 1931
A. neozelandica (Edwards, 1923)
A. penta Santos and Ribeiro, 2018
A. peuma Santos and Ribeiro, 2018
A. regia Santos and Ribeiro, 2018
A. serra Santos and Ribeiro, 2018
A. sperancae Santos and Ribeiro, 2018
A. subterminalis Alexander, 1967
A. tridentata Alexander, 1926
A. trifida Alexander, 1926
A. triton (Alexander, 1922)
A. viridinervis Alexander, 1934
A. vittipennis Alexander, 1925
A. vulcania Santos and Ribeiro, 2018
A. whakapapa Santos and Ribeiro, 2018

References

Limoniidae
Tipuloidea genera